Oylat Cave is a show cave in Bursa Province, northwestern Turkey.

Location and access
It is accessible from İnegöl on the state road to Ankara  E90 southwards, then taking İnegöl-Tavşanlı route  until Gündüzlü village exit, thenafter changing to the provincial road  at the junction marked "Oylat Thermal Spring Resort" and passing through Hilmiye village.

Characteristics

Oylat Cave was formed on a significant, east-west oriented fault line in the marble formation dating back to around 3 Ma. It is situated at the end of the Oylat Creek Canyon in a terrain of the Pliocene period. Fossils have been found in the cave.

There exist three more entrances high above the cave's main entrance. The cave has two interconnected levels, and has a meandering shape.

The stalactites and stalagmites in the cave are colorful. It has a rich natural ecosystem, and is inhabitad by bats, butterflies, worms and guanobites.

A large chamber is reached following a narrow gallery of  width and around  height after entry to the first floor cave. The chamber is occupied by dripstone ponds and gravel yards. It is composed of large blocks, pillars, stalactites and stalagmites as well as gravel, sand and clay layers. 
  
The meteorological conditions inside the cave vary according to the location. Narrow galleries and gateways connecting chambers and floors are somewhat windy. In the narrow gallery, the temperature decreases to  while the humidity goes up to 78%.

Tourism
Located in a spa resort, the cave was opened to tourism in 2006. It is believed that the cave is capable of curing respiratory complaints, such as asthma and bronchitis. The cave is visited by domestic and foreign tourists. While domestic tourists come all around the year, foreign tourists, mostly from Kuwait and the United Arab Emirates, visit the cave during the summer season, between June and October.

Only  of the cave is open to the public. Visiting the cave takes about 90 minutes.

References

Show caves in Turkey
Landforms of Bursa Province
Tourist attractions in Bursa Province
İnegöl District
Medical tourism